Lights on the Hill is a studio album released by Australian country music singer Slim Dusty in August 1975. The album peaked at number 45 on the Kent Music Report and was certified 5× gold in 20 weeks of release.

The album won Album of the Year at the 1976 Country Music Awards of Australia.

Track listing
LP/Cassette

Weekly charts

Certifications

Release history

References

Slim Dusty albums
1975 albums
EMI Records albums